Kiril Milanov (17 September 1948 – 25 January 2011) was a Bulgarian football player who played as a forward.

He played in Marek Dupnitsa, Akademik Sofia and Levski Sofia. He also played for Bulgaria national football team, earning 21 caps and scored 4 goals. Kiril Milanov holds the record for most goals in European club football for a single game with 6 and a tie with 10. He set these records against Finnish Cup Winners Reipas Lahti in 1976–77 CWC season scoring 6 in Sofia and 4 in the away game.

Awards
 Holder of the Bulgarian Cup – 1976,1977 (with PFC Levski Sofia)
 Champion of Bulgaria – 1974,1977 (with PFC Levski Sofia)
 1976–77 UEFA Cup Winners' Cup top scorer – 13 goals
 European Record for most individual goals in a game in all UEFA competitions – 6 goals
 European Record for most individual goals in a tie in all UEFA competitions – 10 goals
 UEFA Cup Winners' Cup All-time top scorers Ratio ranking – 1st place 
 Most goals in a single season in UEFA Cup Winners' Cup All-time ranking – 2nd place
 UEFA Cup Winners' Cup All-time top scorers – 7th place (14 goals)
 1974 FIFA World Cup – 12th place with Bulgaria
 1973–76 Balkan Cup – 1st place with Bulgaria

References

External links 
 Profile at LevskiSofia.info

1948 births
2011 deaths
Bulgarian footballers
Bulgaria international footballers
1974 FIFA World Cup players
PFC Marek Dupnitsa players
Akademik Sofia players
PFC Levski Sofia players
First Professional Football League (Bulgaria) players
Association football forwards
Footballers from Sofia